Ronald Roosevelt Bennett Martínez (born 11 October 1984 in La Ceiba, Honduras) is a Honduran runner. He competed in the 110 metres hurdles event at the 2012 Summer Olympics. He was the flag bearer of Honduras during the opening ceremony.

Personal bests
110 m hurdles: 13.80 s (wind: +1.0 m/s) – Belgrade, Serbia 10 July 2009

Achievements

References

External links

Sports reference biography

1984 births
Living people
People from La Ceiba
Honduran male hurdlers
Olympic athletes of Honduras
Athletes (track and field) at the 2012 Summer Olympics
Pan American Games competitors for Honduras
Athletes (track and field) at the 2007 Pan American Games
Athletes (track and field) at the 2011 Pan American Games
Central American Games gold medalists for Honduras
Central American Games medalists in athletics